Leptopeza is a genus of hybotid flies.

Species
L. borealis Zetterstedt, 1842
L. flavipes (Meigen, 1820)

References

Hybotidae
Brachycera genera
Taxa named by Pierre-Justin-Marie Macquart